Magdalena Brunner (born 10 April 1983) is a Swiss synchronized swimmer who competed in the 2004 Summer Olympics and in the 2008 Summer Olympics.

References

1983 births
Living people
Swiss synchronized swimmers
Olympic synchronized swimmers of Switzerland
Synchronized swimmers at the 2004 Summer Olympics
Synchronized swimmers at the 2008 Summer Olympics